Peter Vilandos is a Greek-American professional poker player. He was born in Greece and now resides in Houston, Texas.  He has won three bracelets at the World Series of Poker.

He first cashed in a poker tournament in 1990, and since that time has cashed in dozens of tournaments.  Vilandos had his first cash in the WSOP in 1993, and won his first WSOP bracelet in 1995 in the $1,500 Pot Limit Holdem event.  He had his highest WSOP Main Event finish the following year, busting out in 21st place, for a prize of $19,500.

Vilandos has also cashed in two World Poker Tour (WPT) $10,000 events. His first cash was in 2002 at the Five Diamond World Poker Classic, finishing in 15th place.  He cashed again in 2003 at the World Poker Open in Tunica, Mississippi, finishing in 21st place.

Vilandos won his second bracelet at the 2009 WSOP, winning a $1,500 No Limit Holdem event and a prize of $607,256.  Earlier in the series, Vilandos had a second-place finish in the $1,000 No Limit Hold'em event, which was won by Steve Sung.

As of 2014, Vilandos' live tournament winnings exceed $3,132,000. His 22 cashes at the WSOP account for $2,410,333 of those winnings.

World Series of Poker Bracelets

Notes

American poker players
Greek poker players
World Series of Poker bracelet winners
Living people
Year of birth missing (living people)